Budleigh Salterton railway station is a closed railway station that served the town of Budleigh Salterton in Devon, England. It was opened by the London and South Western Railway (LSWR) in 1897 but was closed to passengers in 1967 due to the Beeching Axe.

History

The station was originally opened as Salterton, a terminus on the Budleigh Salterton Railway. The station was expanded in 1903 when the line was extended to Exmouth, which formed a loop.

Passenger services were withdrawn on 6 March 1967, when the Sidmouth Junction to Exmouth line was closed to all traffic (goods traffic had already been withdrawn in 1964).

Present state
The track was subsequently lifted by 1969, but the station site remained derelict but intact until the late 1970s.  It was then cleared and redeveloped for housing - as such, no trace remains today.

References

Disused railway stations in Devon
Railway stations in Great Britain opened in 1897
Railway stations in Great Britain closed in 1967
Former London and South Western Railway stations
Beeching closures in England
Budleigh Salterton